Ballet russe is French for Russian ballet.

Ballet Russe may also refer to:

 Ballets Russes, an itinerant ballet company based in Paris that performed between 1909 and 1929 throughout Europe and on tours to North and South America
 Original Ballet Russe, originally named Ballets Russes de Monte-Carlo, a ballet company established in 1931 as a successor to the Ballets Russes; closed in 1947
 Ballet Russe de Monte-Carlo, a ballet company created by members of the Ballets Russes de Monte Carlo in 1937; closed in 1968
 Ballets Russes (film), an American 2005 feature documentary about the dancers of the Ballet Russe de Monte Carlo